Leverett House is one of twelve undergraduate residential Houses at Harvard University. It is situated along the north bank of the Charles River in Cambridge and consists of McKinlock Hall, constructed in 1925; two 12-story towers completed in 1960; and two floors of 20 DeWolfe Street, a building Leverett shares with two other houses at Harvard. It has the largest student population within the Harvard house system.

Structure
 The bulk of McKinlock Hall consists of 5 entryways (labeled A through E), each of which leads to four or five floors of suites for approximately 35 students. McKinlock Hall's iconic oval window belongs to the Iliad Suite, named in gratitude for the generous gift of an anonymous donor. This suite, highly coveted amongst Leverett seniors, is awarded to the “Most Attractive” group of rising seniors selected during a House-wide popular vote. McKinlock houses the Leverett Dining Hall, the Junior and Senior Common Rooms, the Old Library Theatre, the Faculty Dean's Residence, and several other common spaces.

The Leverett Towers (commonly referred to as F- and G-Tower, corresponding to their respective entryway labels) serve a primarily residential function. Each tower consists primarily of singles and doubles and holds approximately 150 students. The top floors of the towers - especially those facing south - boast outstanding views of the Boston skyline and the Charles River. The ground floor of G-Tower features a common area that house residents have nicknamed the "G-spot," although the space goes largely unused due to its poor design. The ground floor of F-tower includes a common area similar to the one found in G-Tower, as well as several offices belonging to the Allston Burr Resident Dean and House Administrator. Between the towers and McKinlock sits the Leverett Library, which was constructed along with the towers and has won awards for its innovative design. The ground floor of the library building houses the building manager's office.

The top floors of 20 DeWolfe Street were annexed by the house in fall of 2007. Originally intended for faculty or graduate students, the DeWolfe suites are smaller apartment-style units with more modern amenities than those available in either McKinlock or Leverett Towers.

History
Leverett House was named after John Leverett (whose grandfather, John Leverett had been the governor of the Massachusetts Bay Colony), who was President of Harvard from 1708 to 1724. Leverett's election was one of the significant turning points for Harvard, for every President before him had been a clergyman. Leverett was a leader of the liberal movement in the Congregational Church and he opposed the powerful clergymen Increase Mather and Cotton Mather, who had attempted to impose upon the College a new charter containing a loyalty oath that would have refused appointment to the faculty of anyone not willing to acknowledge the primacy of Biblical scripture. Leverett, during his tenure as president, improved the quality of instruction in the College, and maintained the position of Harvard in the critical years when Yale was becoming a formidable rival.

In the mid-1920s, Harvard constructed student residences on the banks of the recently dammed Charles River. These residences were initially occupied by freshmen. McKinlock Hall, built in 1925, was one of those original buildings. The building was donated by the family of Lieutenant George Alexander McKinlock Jr, a Harvard graduate who was killed by a German machine gun near Soissons in 1918.

With the formation of Leverett House in 1930-31, Mather Hall, across Mill Street, was built along with the present dining hall and Master's residence. Six squash courts were also constructed, adjacent to Mather Hall. Leverett remained in that configuration until the early 1960s, when the College expanded and new Houses were added. Mather Hall became a part of Quincy House, the squash courts were lost, and the Leverett Towers were built. The Saltonstall family gave money for a new library in honor of the ten generations of Saltonstalls who had attended Harvard, and the House offices moved to the first floor of F-Tower. Shepley, Bulfinch, Richardson and Abbott designed the two-story library, as well as the two twelve-story Leverett Towers that were constructed at the same time. In 1983, McKinlock was renovated, and at that time a new entrance to the dining hall was constructed.

The first Master of the House was Kenneth Murdock, Professor of English and Dean of the Faculty of Arts and Sciences.

The second Master was Leigh Hoadley, an embryologist and professor of zoology. Hoadley resigned in 1957, shortly before Leverett was to be renovated.

The third Master was John J. Conway, a scholar of Canadian history. He married his wife Jill, who was a graduate student in Harvard's history department at the time, in the early 1960s.

The fourth Master was Richard T. Gill, an economist. A bass singer, Gill sang each year in the Leverett House Opera, which was a fixture in the House. While Master, he auditioned for the New York City Opera and was offered a contract. He accepted and left Harvard, economics, and Leverett to begin a new career, first with the New York City Opera, and later with the Metropolitan Opera.

The fifth Co-Masters, Kenneth Andrews and Carolyn Andrews, were appointed in 1971. During their tenure, the Houses became coeducational. Andrews was a professor at Harvard Business School and the first Business School faculty member to be appointed Master. During Harvard's 350th anniversary celebration in 1986, Andrews was one of 20 individuals who received a Harvard Medal for distinguished service to the University. His citation read: "He understands, as Mark Twain never did, how business works best; his writings elucidate the complex subject to the benefit of his Harvard colleagues and of managers everywhere."

Renowned biologist John E. Dowling and his wife Judith were appointed as the sixth Co-Masters of Leverett House in 1981 and served until 1998.

The seventh Faculty Deans, Howard Georgi and his wife Ann, were appointed in 1998 and served until 2018. Howard and Ann, more commonly known as Chief and Coach respectively, are beloved for their house pride, their dogs, and monkey bread, a delicious cinnamon-flavored treat popular among Leverett students.

Brian D. Farrell and Irina Ferreras were appointed as the eighth Faculty Deans in 2018. Farrell is a professor of biology and curator of entomology at the Museum of Comparative Zoology. Ferreras is a curatorial assistant at the Harvard University Herbaria. In their first year as Faculty Deans, they have supported the appreciation of art and nature by inviting Brazilian artist  to exhibit his works and by hosting nature walks for students, but also received criticism for their perceived lack of dedication to the house.

Farrell and Ferreras announced their departure following the 2022 academic year. Eileen Reynolds and Daniel Deschler currently lead the house as interim deans until their appointment as permanent faculty deans on July 1, 2023.

People

Notable alumni of Leverett House include Aga Khan IV, Colin Jost, Timothy Crouse, Andrew Glaze, Al Jean, Alexander Keyssar, Anthony Lake, Steven Levitt, Jeremy Lin, Saul Perlmutter, Mike Reiss, Chief Justice John G. Roberts, Sydney Schanberg, Pete Seeger, Laurence Tribe, John Weidman, Cornel West, and Pete Buttigieg. Yo-Yo Ma was a music tutor for the house. Archibald MacLeish, Perry Miller, and Lillian Hellman lived on the top of F-Tower. Secretary of Education Arne Duncan and Secretary of Housing and Urban Development Shaun Donovan, both cabinet officials in the Obama Administration, also resided in Leverett during their times at Harvard.

House symbols

The House Shield is a derivative of the ancient Leverett family crest depicting three hares rampant with an inverted chevron. The family name is derived from the word "leveret" (with one "t"), which means young hare; family tradition has it that the earliest recorded family members were keepers of ferrets, which were trained to chase rabbits from their burrows. The official house colors are black and yellow, appearing on the earliest House paraphernalia that can be found. However, the combinations of black and red as well as green and yellow are often used. Annual T-shirt designs usually feature some combination of those four colors. Leverett House has a sister house at Yale, Timothy Dwight College.

External links

 Leverett House official site
 "LevSPN" - Official YouTube Channel for Leverett Intramurals

References

Harvard Houses
University and college dormitories in the United States
Harvard University